The Orson Everitt House is a private house located at 39040 West Seven Mile Road in Livonia, Michigan. It was added to the National Register of Historic Places in 1980.

Description 
The Orson Everitt House is an irregularly massed -story wooden house with a hipped roof and clapboard siding with a multi-colored paint scheme.  The principal feature of the facade is the broad porch which spans the front; the porch features turned balusters and a circular turret at one end.  Various dormers, including a turret with conical, roof break the roof line.

History
Marshall Everitt first settled on the property where this house was built in 1830.  A few years later, the family built a simple structure just east of the current house location.  As the family prospered, more structures were added, and in 1899, Marshall's grandson Orson Everitt built this house. It is likely the design of the house was selected from a house plan book; a similar house plan can be found in Herbert C. Chivers' Artistic Homes.

Orson Everitt still owned the property in 1915.  The house was converted to office space in 1979 by the law firm of Klein and Bloom.

References

Houses on the National Register of Historic Places in Michigan
Queen Anne architecture in Michigan
Houses completed in 1899
Livonia, Michigan
Houses in Wayne County, Michigan
1899 establishments in Michigan
National Register of Historic Places in Wayne County, Michigan